Shalford Preceptory was a preceptory of Knights Hospitaller at Shalford in the civil parish of Brimpton in the English county of Berkshire. It was established in the late 12th century. By 1338, it had merged with the preceptory at Greenham.

The chapel survives, though it was converted into a barn before 1614. It is a Grade II* listed building.

References

Monasteries in Berkshire
West Berkshire District
Preceptories of the Knights Hospitaller in England
12th-century establishments in England
Grade II* listed buildings in Berkshire
Christian monasteries established in the 12th century